Saint-Jean-Chrysostome is a sector within the Les Chutes-de-la-Chaudière-Est borough of the city of Lévis in central Quebec, Canada south of Quebec City on the south bank of the Saint Lawrence River. It was a separate town, incorporated in 1828, but in 2002 was amalgamated into Lévis.

It is a mostly suburban community, connected to Quebec City by bus (Société de transport de Lévis) via Sainte-Foy. The main high school is École secondaire l'Horizon.

According to the Canada 2006 Census:

Population: 18,016
% Change (2001–2006): +5.4
Dwellings: 6,513
Area (km2): 85.80 km2
Density (persons per km2): 210.0

References

Neighbourhoods in Lévis, Quebec
Former municipalities in Quebec
Populated places disestablished in 2002